Lesyutino is a rural locality (a village) in Nyuksenskoye Rural Settlement, Nyuksensky District, Vologda Oblast, Russia. The population was 279 as of 2002. There are 11 streets.

Geography 
Lesyutino is located 14 km northwest of Nyuksenitsa (the district's administrative centre) by road. Zaborye is the nearest rural locality.

References 

Rural localities in Nyuksensky District